This is a list of events that happened in 2011 in Mexico. The article also lists the most important political leaders during the year at both federal and state levels.

Incumbents

Federal government
 President: Felipe Calderón 

 Interior Secretary (SEGOB)
Francisco Blake Mora, until November 11 (died in office)
Alejandro Poiré Romero, starting November 17
 Secretary of Foreign Affairs (SRE): Patricia Espinosa
 Communications Secretary (SCT)
Juan Molinar Horcasitas, until January 7 
Dionisio Pérez-Jácome Friscione, starting January 7 
 Education Secretary (SEP): Alonso Lujambio
 Secretary of Defense (SEDENA): Guillermo Galván Galván
 Secretary of Navy (SEMAR): Mariano Francisco Saynez Mendoza
 Secretary of Labor and Social Welfare (STPS)
Javier Lozano Alarcón, until December 14
Rosalinda Vélez Juárez, starting December 14 
 Secretary of Welfare (SEDESOL): Heriberto Félix Guerra
 Secretary of Public Education (SEP): 
 Tourism Secretary (SECTUR): 
 Secretary of the Environment (SEMARNAT): Juan Rafael Elvira Quesada
 Secretary of Health (SALUD)
José Ángel Córdova, until September 9
Salomón Chertorivski Woldenberg, starting September 9
Secretary of Energy (SENER)
José Antonio Meade, until September 9
Jordy Herrera Flores, starting September 9
Secretary of Finance and Public Credit (SHCP)
Ernesto Cordero Arroyo, until September 9
José Antonio Meade, starting September 9
Secretary of Economy (SE): Bruno Ferrari García de Alba
Secretariat of Public Security (SSP): Genaro García Luna

Governors

 Aguascalientes: Carlos Lozano de la Torre 
 Baja California: José Guadalupe Osuna Millán 
Baja California Sur
Narciso Agúndez Montaño , until April 5.
Marcos Covarrubias Villaseñor , starting April 5.
 Campeche: Fernando Ortega Bernés 
 Chiapas: Juan Sabines Guerrero, (Coalition for the Good of All)
 Chihuahua: César Duarte Jáquez  
 Coahuila
Humberto Moreira , until January 4
Jorge Torres López , January 4–November 30
Rubén Moreira , starting December 1
 Colima: Mario Anguiano Moreno 
 Durango: Jorge Herrera Caldera 
 Guanajuato: Juan Manuel Oliva 
 Guerrero
Zeferino Torreblanca , until March 31
Ángel Aguirre Rivero , starting April 1
 Hidalgo
Miguel Ángel Osorio Chong 
Francisco Olvera Ruiz 
 Jalisco: Emilio González Márquez 
 State of Mexico
Enrique Peña Nieto , until September 16
Eruviel Ávila Villegas , starting September 16
 Michoacán: Leonel Godoy Rangel 
 Morelos: Marco Antonio Adame .
 Nayarit: Ney González Sánchez
 Nuevo León: Rodrigo Medina de la Cruz 
 Oaxaca: Gabino Cué Monteagudo, Convergence
 Puebla
Mario Plutarco Marín Torres , until January 31
Rafael Moreno Valle Rosas , starting February 1
 Querétaro: José Calzada 
 Quintana Roo
Félix González Canto , until April 4
Roberto Borge Angulo , starting April 5 
 San Luis Potosí: Fernando Toranzo Fernández 
 Sinaloa: Mario López Valdez, starting January 1
 Sonora: Guillermo Padrés Elías 
 Tabasco: Andrés Granier Melo 
 Tamaulipas: Egidio Torre Cantú , starting January 1	
 Tlaxcala
Héctor Ortiz Ortiz , untl January 14
Mariano González Zarur , starting January 15
 Veracruz: Javier Duarte de Ochoa 
 Yucatán: Ivonne Ortega Pacheco 
 Zacatecas: Amalia García 
Head of Government of the Federal District: Marcelo Ebrard (PRD)

Events

January–March

January
 January 6 – the poet and women's rights activist Susana Chávez is murdered in Ciudad Juarez.
 January 14 – Mexican Drug War: 14 people are killed in a shootout after 100 soldiers, marines and police in Xalapa, Veracruz, surround a house.
 January 25 – Gunmen open fire on a crowd at a soccer game in Ciudad Juarez, Mexico, killing seven people.
 January 30 – State elections in Guerrero.
February
 February 6 – State elections in Baja California Sur.
 February 8 – The Mexican Army rescues 44 Guatemalan immigrants in Reynosa in northern Mexico.
 February 13 – Unidentified gunmen kill eight people in Ciudad Nezahualcóyotl part of the Mexico City Metropolitan Area.
 February 15 – Two U.S. Immigration and Customs Enforcement officers are shot while travelling between Monterrey and Mexico City with one officer dying.
 February 20 – Mexican Drug War: 53 people are killed in a 72-hour period in Ciudad Juarez, Mexico.
March
 March 1 – Seventeen bodies are found in clandestine graves in Mexico's Guerrero state.

April–June
April
 April 6 – 2011 Tamaulipas massacre: At least 177 bodies are found in a mass grave in Mexico's Tamaulipas state.

May
 May 8 – Bicentennial celebrations in Monterrey.

June
 June 7 – The former Governor of Chiapas state in Mexico Pablo Salazar is arrested on charges on embezzling more than $90 million from hurricane relief funds.

July–September
July
 July 3
 State elections in the State of Mexico.
 State elections in Nayarit.
 Voters in Mexico go to the polls for local elections in the states of Mexico, Coahuila, Nayarit, Puebla and Hidalgo.

August
 August 8 – Monterrey Tech bombing: A homemade bomb explodes at Monterrey Institute of Technology and Higher Education, Estado de México Campus in Atizapán de Zaragoza. The bomb was sent to a professor of robotics who was injured along with a guard at the university.
 August 25 – 2011 Monterrey casino attack: more than 50 people are killed in an attack on a casino in Monterrey, Nuevo León, Mexico.
 August 30 – The Popocatepetl volcano south of Mexico City starts spewing ash into the sky.

September

October–December
October
November
 November 13 – State elections in Michoacán.

December

Awards

	
Belisario Domínguez Medal of Honor – Cuauhtémoc Cárdenas Solorzano	
Order of the Aztec Eagle	
National Prize for Arts and Sciences	
National Public Administration Prize	
Ohtli Award
 Alexander Gonzalez
 Charlie Gonzalez
 Carlos Gutierrez
 Salud Carbajal
 Francisco G. Cigarroa
 Paddy Moloney
 Mel Martínez
 David J. Schmidly
 Richard A. Tapia
 Alfredo Quiñones-Hinojosa
 Edward James Olmos

Notable deaths

January to June

January 5 – Saúl Vara Rivera, politician , Mayor of Zaragoza, Coahuila; shot. (body found on this date)
 January 11 
Abraham Ortíz Rosales, politician , Mayor of Temoac, Morelos; shot.
Susana Chávez, poet and human rights activist, strangled. (death confirmed on this date)
 January 13 – Luis Jiménez Mata, politician, Mayor of Santiago Amoltepec; shot.
February 4 – Juan Carlos Guardado Méndez, politician , former municipal president of Fresnillo, Zacatecas; murdered.
February 9 – Rodolfo Ochoa Moreno, journalist (Grupo Multimedios Laguna), Torreón, Coahuila; killed.
February 12 – Saturnino Valdez Llanos, politician ||, municipal president of Tampico Alto, Veracruz; murdered.
February 22 – 	José Luis Prieto Torres, politician, former president of Allende Municipality, Chihuahua; murdered.
February 28 – Enrique Chávez Gómez, politician , former candidate for municipal president of Saucillo, Chihuahua; murdered.
March 10 – Mario Chuc Aguilar, politician, former municipal president of Felipe Carrillo Puerto, Quintana Roo; murdered.
March 25 – José Luis Cerda Meléndez & Luis Emanuel Ruiz Carrillo, journalists (La Prensa), Guadalupe, Nuevo León; killed.
April 7 – Enterbio Reyes Bello, politician, former president of Copanatoyac (municipality), Guerrero; murdered.
May 14 – Silvia Moreno Leal, politician, former president of Balleza Municipality, Chihuahua; murdered.
May 18 – Fernando Duarte Flores, politician, former municipal president of Hidalgo, Coahuila; murdered.
May 31 – Noel López Olguín, journalist (La Verdad de Jáltipan), Chinameca, Veracruz; killed.
June 7 – Gonzalo Amador Ortega, politician , former candidate for municipal president of Huauchinango, Puebla; murdered.
June 14 – Pablo Ruelas Barraza, journalist (Diario del Yaqui & El Regional de Sonora), Huatabampo, Sonora; killed.
June 20 – Miguel Ángel López Velasco, journalist (Notiver), Veracruz; killed.
June 24 – Gonzalo Amador Ortega, politician , former candidate for municipal president of Huauchinango, Puebla; murdered.

July to December
July 3 – Ángel Castillo Corona, journalist (Puntual and Diario de México), Ocuilan State of Mexico; killed.
July 21 – Ernesto Cornejo Valenzuela, politician , former candidate for deputy; state delegate for the PAN in Benito Juárez Municipality, Sonora; murdered.
July 26 – Yolanda Ordaz de la Cruz, journalist (Notiver), Veracruz, Veracruz; killed.
July 28 – Fortino Cortés Sandoval, politician, municipal president of Florencia de Benito Juárez, Zacatecas; murdered.
August 20 – José Eduviges Nava Altamirano, politician , municipal president of Zacualpan, State of Mexico; murdered.
August 24 – Luz María García Villagrán, politician, president of Gran Morelos Municipality, Chihuahua; murdered.||
September 1
Ana María Marcela Yarce Viveros, journalist (Contralínea), Iztapalapa, Mexico City; killed.
Rocío González Trápaga, journalist (Televisa Mexico City), Iztapalapa, Mexico City; killed.
September 15 – Gustavo Pacheco Villaseñor, politician , former municipal president of San Juan Bautista Tuxtepec, Oaxaca; murdered.
September 17 – Moisés Villanueva de la Luz, politician ,Deputy from Tlapa de Comonfort (municipality), Guerrero; murdered.
September 24 – María Elizabeth Macías Castro, journalist (Primera Hora), Nuevo Laredo, Tamaulipas; killed.
August 25 – Humberto Millán Salazar, journalist (A Discusión and Radio Fórmula Culiacán), Culiacán, Sinaloa; killed.
October 8 — José de las Fuentes Rodríguez, lawyer and politician ; Governor of Coahuila 1981–1987 (b. 1920)
November 2 – Ricardo Guzmán Romero, politician , municipal president of La Piedad, Michoacán; murdered.
November 19 – Roberto Miguel Galván, politician, former municipal president of Tepetzintla, Veracruz; murdered.
December 3 – Hugo César Muruato Flores, journalist (La Caliente 90.9), Chihuahua, Chihuahua; killed.
December 12 – Fortunato Ruiz Blázquez, politician, former municipal president of Ixhuacán, Veracruz; murdered.
December 21 – José Martínez Mendoza, politician, former municipal president of Cosalá, Sinaloa; murdered.
 December 24 – José Andrés Corral Arredondo, 65, Roman Catholic prelate, Bishop of Parral (1992-2011); heart attack.
 December 26 – Pedro Armendáriz, Jr., 71, actor (Zorro series); cancer, died in New York City, United States.
December 31 – Porfirio Flores Ayala, politician ||former president of Cuernavaca Municipality, Morelos; murdered.

See also
 2011 Mexican fire season
 List of Mexican films of 2011

Notes

References

External links

 
2010s in Mexico
Years of the 21st century in Mexico